Montessori schools are schools following the principles of Montessori education according to Maria Montessori. Notable Montessori schools include:
 6th Montessori School Anne Frank, Amsterdam, Netherlands
 Anna-Schmidt-Schule, Frankfurt am Main, Germany
 Beachside Montessori Village, Hollywood, Florida, USA
 Beechworth Secondary College - Montessori Adolescent Program, Beechworth, Victoria, Australia 
 Anne-Claire Montessori School, Taguig, Metro Manila, Philippines
 Bereton Montessori Nursery and Primary School, Rivers State, Nigeria
 Cambridge Montessori school, Massachusetts, USA
 Children's House Montessori School, Dublin, Ireland
 Clark Montessori High School, Cincinnati, Ohio, USA
 City Montessori School, Lucknow, India
 Clever Lane Montessori School, San Leonardo, Nueva Ecija, Philippines
 De Roman Montessori School, Tanza, Cavite, Philippines
 First Island Montessori School, Lagos, Nigeria
 Franciscan Montessori Earth School & Saint Francis Academy, Portland, Oregon, USA
 Gimnasio Moderno, Bogotá, Colombia
 Great River Charter Montessori School, Saint Paul, Minnesota, USA
 Inner Sydney Montessori School, New South Wales, Australia
 Island Children's Montessori School, North Point, Hong Kong
 Istituto Italiano Statale Omnicomprensivo di Asmara, Eritrea
 John M. Tobin Montessori School, Cambridge, Massachusetts, USA
 Joliet Montessori School, Crest Hill, Illinois, USA
 Kamala Niketan Montessori School, Tiruchchirapalli, India
 Khan Lab School (Montessori 2.0), Mountain View, California, USA
 La Belle Montessori School, Silang, Cavite, Philippines
 MacDowell Montessori School, Milwaukee, Wisconsin, USA
 Midland Montessori School, Midland, Michigan, USA
 Modern Montessori School, Amman, Jordan
 Montessori High School at University Circle, Cleveland, Ohio, USA
 Montessori Lyceum Amsterdam, Netherlands
 Montessori Oberschule Potsdam, Germany
 Montessori School of Anderson, South Carolina, USA
 Montessori School of Louisville, Kentucky, USA
 Mountainview Montessori School, Surrey, British Columbia, Canada
 New Horizon Montessori School, Louisville, Tennessee, USA
 Oxford Montessori Schools, England, Great Britain
 Perkkaanpuiston Montessorikoulu, Perkkaa, Espoo, Finland
 Perth Montessori School, Perth, Western   Australia
 Queensland Independent College, Merrimac, Gold Coast, Australia
 Qingdao Amerasia International School, China
 Rhein-Main International Montessori School, Friedrichsdorf, Hessen, Germany
 Ruffing Montessori, Cleveland Heights, Ohio, USA
 Seisen International School, Tokyo, Japan
 Siragu Montessori School, Chennai, India
 School of the Woods, Houston, Texas, USA
 Southernside Montessori School, Muntinlupa, Philippines
 Southern Wake Montessori School, Holly Springs, NC, USA
 St. Catherine's Montessori School, Houston, Texas, USA
 Sto. Rosario Montessori School, Valenzuela, Metro Manila, Philippines
 Sydney Montessori School, New South Wales, Australia
 Thacher Montessori School, Milton, Massachusetts, USA
 Toronto Montessori Schools, Ontario, Canada
 Whitby School, Greenwich, Connecticut, USA
 Wilmington Montessori School, Delaware, USA

See also 
 Montessori school (disambiguation)
 
 
 Montessori (disambiguation)
 List of democratic schools
 List of Sudbury schools
 Lists of schools

References

Montessori

ru:Школа Монтессори